Kiến Thụy is a rural district (huyện) of Hai Phong, the third largest city of Vietnam.

Districts of Haiphong